Harvey House of Florence, Kansas, United States, also known under the older name of Clifton Hotel, was listed on the National Register of Historic Places (NRHP) in 1973.

History
The current building is part of the first Fred Harvey House, of the Fred Harvey Company, which stood south of the Santa Fe railroad tracks until the early 20th century. The existing structure was the original part of the Clifton Hotel that was erected to serve passengers of the Atchison, Topeka and Santa Fe Railway as a permanent eating station and hotel for passengers.  This Harvey House is notable, since it was the first one to provide sleeping facilities.  The Harvey House was built in 1876, closed in 1900, operations were transferred to Newton, currently it is a museum.

TV
 Feasting on Asphalt, 2006, season 1 episode 3 titled "High Plains Feaster", 7.5 minutes of video while Alton Brown visited the Spring Fling event and Harvey House in Florence.

See also

 National Register of Historic Places listings in Marion County, Kansas

Further reading
 Appetite for America - How Visionary Businessman Fred Harvey Built a Railroad Hospitality Empire That Civilized the Wild West; Stephen Fried; Bantam Books; ; 544 pages; March 23, 2010.
 1872-1972 Century Of Pride - Florence Centennial - Florence, Kansas; 1972.
 Florence 75th Anniversary edition (includes stories of the Fred Harvey hotel); Florence Bulletin; June 5, 1947.
 Marion County Kansas : Past and Present; Sondra Van Meter; MB Publishing House; LCCN 72-92041; 344 pages; 1972.

References

External links
Harvey House
 Official Website
 
 
Maps
 Florence City Map, KDOT

Houses on the National Register of Historic Places in Kansas
Houses completed in 1876
Houses in Marion County, Kansas
Museums in Marion County, Kansas
Historic house museums in Kansas
Fred Harvey Company
National Register of Historic Places in Marion County, Kansas